Dr. Joseph P. Dorr House is a historic home located at Hillsdale in Columbia County, New York.  It was built in the early 19th century and is a red brick dwelling with a 2-story main block and -story kitchen ell.  It features a fully pedimented gable with an elliptically shaped fanlight.

It was added to the National Register of Historic Places in 2007.

References

Houses on the National Register of Historic Places in New York (state)
Federal architecture in New York (state)
Houses in Columbia County, New York
National Register of Historic Places in Columbia County, New York